is a former Japanese football player for Suzuka Unlimited FC. He also holds Irish citizenship. His twin brother Niall is also a professional footballer.

Club career 
Killoran was born in Tokyo to a Japanese mother and Irish father.

Killoran is a product of Tokyo Verdy's youth system, first entering the club as a ten-year-old.
He was a member of the All Japan club youth tournament winning team in 2010.

On 8 January 2012, Killoran joined Giravanz Kitakyushu on a season-long loan deal. His first league appearance came on 4 March 2012 against Tokushima Vortis.

On 15 June 2013, Killoran made his league debut for Tokyo Verdy, coming on as a 29th-minute substitute in the 2-1 loss to V-Varen Nagasaki.

Killoran spent a year in Germany (2015/6) with German club SC Kapellen-Erft

International career 
In August 2010, Killoran was selected to Japan U-19 team for the SBS International Youth Tournament.

Club statistics
Updated to 20 February 2016.

References

External links 

J.League

1992 births
Living people
Association football people from Tokyo
Japanese footballers
J2 League players
J3 League players
Tokyo Verdy players
Giravanz Kitakyushu players
Blaublitz Akita players
Suzuka Point Getters players
Japanese people of Irish descent
Japanese twins
Twin sportspeople
Association football defenders